Pierzchnianka  is a village in the administrative district of Gmina Pierzchnica, within Kielce County, Świętokrzyskie Voivodeship, in south-central Poland.

The village has a population of 250.

References

Pierzchnianka